Merlin Rex Lybbert (31 January 1926 – 6 July 2001) was a general authority of the Church of Jesus Christ of Latter-day Saints (LDS Church) from 1989 to 1994. From 1992 to 1994, Lybbert was the thirteenth general president of the LDS Church's Sunday School.

Lybbert was born in Cardston, Alberta, Canada. After a short period of service in the Canadian Army near the end of World War II, Lybbert served as a missionary in the church's Eastern States Mission. After his mission, he married Nola Cahoon in the Alberta Temple in 1949.

Prior to his call as a general authority, Lybbert served in the church as a bishop, stake president and regional representative. In 1989, he became one of the inaugural members of the Second Quorum of the Seventy. As a general authority, he was a member of the presidency of the church's Asia Area. Lybbert was released as a general authority in 1994, and served as president of the Alberta Temple from 1994 to 1997.

Lybbert died in Salt Lake City, Utah. He and his wife had six children, including a daughter, Ruth, who married Dale G. Renlund, who later became a member of the church's Quorum of the Twelve Apostles.

References
“Elder Merlin R. Lybbert of the Second Quorum of the Seventy,” Ensign, May 1989, p. 98

External links
Grampa Bill's G.A. Pages: Merlin R. Lybbert

1926 births
2001 deaths
Canadian general authorities (LDS Church)
Canadian Mormon missionaries in the United States
Members of the Second Quorum of the Seventy (LDS Church)
General Presidents of the Sunday School (LDS Church)
People from Cardston
Temple presidents and matrons (LDS Church)
Regional representatives of the Twelve
20th-century Mormon missionaries